The 2020 Shenzhen Open was a tennis tournament played on outdoor hard courts. It was the eighth edition of the Shenzhen Open, and part of the WTA International tournaments of the 2020 WTA Tour. It took place at the Shenzhen Longgang Sports Center in Shenzhen, China, from 5 to 11 January 2020.

Points and prize money

Point distribution

Prize money

1 Qualifiers prize money is also the Round of 32 prize money
* per team

Singles main draw entrants

Seeds

1 Rankings as of December 30, 2019.

Other entrants
The following players received wildcards into the singles main draw:
 Duan Yingying
 Wang Xinyu
 Wang Xiyu
 
The following players received entry into the singles main draw using a protected ranking:
  Kateryna Bondarenko
  Shelby Rogers

The following players received entry from the qualifying draw:
  Irina-Camelia Begu
  Anna-Lena Friedsam 
  Margarita Gasparyan
  Nicole Gibbs

Doubles main draw entrants

Seeds

1 Rankings as of December 30, 2019

Other entrants 
The following pairs received wildcards into the doubles main draw:
  Jiang Xinyu /  Tang Qianhui 
  Ma Shuyue /  Yuan Yue

The following pair received entry into the doubles main draw using a protected ranking:
  Kateryna Bondarenko /  Lidziya Marozava

Champions

Singles

  Ekaterina Alexandrova def.  Elena Rybakina, 6–2, 6–4

Doubles

  Barbora Krejčíková /  Kateřina Siniaková def.  Duan Yingying /  Zheng Saisai, 6–2, 3–6, [10–4]

References

External links
Official website 

2020 in Chinese tennis
2020 WTA Tour
January 2020 sports events in China
2020